Robert Montague Frith (1944 – 2021) was an English male former track and field athlete.

Career
Frith’s earliest national success saw his Middlesex Schools colleagues, Andrew Ronay, Mick Hauck and the late Barry King, join him in taking the Senior Boys 4x110yards Relay title at the English Schools Championships.
Frith was subsequently selected to represent Team GB and England at the international level and won a silver medal at the 1968 European Indoor Games, followed by a bronze at the 1969 competition in Belgrade.

Frith held the world indoor record for 50 metres and was four times National AAA indoor champion over 60 metres.

He represented England in the 100 yards, as well as being part of the sprint relay squad, at the 1966 British Empire and Commonwealth Games in Kingston, Jamaica.

He was a member of Polytechnic Harriers and latterly the merged (from 1985) Kingston Athletics Club and Polytechnic Harriers. He was also general secretary of the former club from 1972 to 1975.

References

1944 births
English male sprinters
Athletes (track and field) at the 1966 British Empire and Commonwealth Games
Living people
Commonwealth Games competitors for England
Universiade medalists in athletics (track and field)
Universiade bronze medalists for Great Britain